Chatmohar Raja Chandra Nath and Babu Shambhu Nath Model Pilot High School and College, also referred to as Chatmohar High School or Chatmohar RCN and BSN Model Pilot High School, is a private school in Chatmohar Upazila of Pabna District in Bangladesh. 

The school, founded in 1861, is one of the oldest educational institutions in Bangladesh. The school offers education for students ranging from sixth grade to twelfth grade.

Gallery

References

Educational institutions established in 1861
Schools in Pabna District
1861 establishments in British India